Aligudarz County is in Lorestan province, Iran. The capital of the county is the city of Aligudarz. At the 2006 census, the county's population was 134,802 in 28,668 households. The following census in 2011 counted 140,275 people in 35,020 households. At the 2016 census, the county's population was 137,534 in 38,503 households. The county is populated by various Lur tribes.

Administrative divisions

The population history and structural changes of Aligudarz County's administrative divisions over three consecutive censuses are shown in the following table. The latest census shows five districts, 12 rural districts, and two cities.

Gallery

References

 

Counties of Lorestan Province